Wynne Jammin' is a 1980 album by Philippé Wynne, the former lead singer of the Spinners. It was the second album released on the Uncle Jam/CBS label, fronted by Parliament-Funkadelic leader George Clinton and his manager Archie Ivy. The album features many musicians from the P-Funk stable.

The album was produced by George Clinton, Ron Dunbar and Philippé Wynne. Wynne Jammin' was reissued by CBS/Sony in Japan on 5/21/94, but quickly went out of print. The original album contained a lyric sheet.

Track listing

 "Never Gonna Tell It" (George Clinton, Bernie Worrell) (released as a single-Uncle Jam/CBS 9900 and 12" B-side to "Freak To Freak" by the Sweat Band-Uncle Jam/CBS AS 874)
 "Put Your Own Puzzle Together" (J. Glover, J. Dean) (released as a single- Uncle Jam/CBS ZS6 9902)
 "You Make Me Happy (You Got The Love I Need)" (Philippé Wynne) 
 "We Dance So Good Together" (J. Glover, J. Dean)
 "Hotel Eternity" (Gary Hudgins, Daryl Clinton, Philippé Wynne, Robert Johnson)
 "Breakout" (Philippé Wynne)
 "You Gotta Take Chances" (J. Glover, J. Dean)

Personnel
Brandye (Telma Hopkins, Donna Davis Sadler, Pamela Vincent, Melody McCully), Philippé Wynne, Jerome Rodgers, Robert Johnson, Ron Ford, Ray Davis, The Doc, Michael "Clip" Payne, Stevie Pannell, David Lee Chong, Jessica Cleaves, Andre Williams, Jeanette McGruder, Shirley Hayden, Chanta Payne, Cheryl James, Sheila Horne - vocals
Mike Hampton, Bruce Nazarian, Kenny Birch, Garry Shider, Dennis Coffey, Willie "Preacher" Hampton - guitar
Rodney Curtis, Bruce Nazarian, Donny Sterling, Frank Bryant - bass
Tyrone Lampkin, Jerry Jones - drums
Carl "Butch" Small, Larry Fratangelo - percussion
Bernie Worrell, David Lee Chong - synthesizer
Gordon Staples, Felix Resnick and the Detroit Symphony Orchestra - strings
John Trudell, Ernie Rogers, Angelo Carlisi, Ted Jackson, Gordon Stump, Leo Harrison, Maurice Davis, Fred Boldt, Mike Sutter, Marcus Belgrave - horns
George Clinton, Ron Dunbar, Philippé Wynne - background arrangements
Rudy Robinson, Bernie Worrell - rhythm arrangements
Paul Riser, Tony Camillo - string and horn arrangements
Diem Jones - art direction

1980 albums
Philippé Wynne albums
albums arranged by Paul Riser